Electric Music for the Mind and Body is Country Joe and the Fish's debut album. Released in May 1967 on the Vanguard label, it was one of the first psychedelic albums to come out of San Francisco.

Tracks from the LP, especially "Section 43", "Grace", and "Not So Sweet Martha Lorraine" were played on progressive FM rock stations like KSAN and KMPX in San Francisco, often back-to-back. A version of the song "Love" was performed at the 1969 Woodstock Festival.

"Grace" is a tribute to Jefferson Airplane's lead singer, Grace Slick.

Recording
The album was recorded during the first week of February 1967 at Sierra Sound Laboratories, Berkeley, California, by Robert DeSousa, with production by Samuel Charters. It was released on May 11, 1967, on the Vanguard label.  Due to deterioration of the original master tapes, the album was remixed in 1982 and this remix was used for the original CD release in 1990.

In 2013 a new two-disc deluxe version appeared which included both the original mono and stereo mixes.  It is the first time producer Sam Charters’ original stereo mixdown has been issued on compact disc. The liner notes to the 2013 version state that an outtake from the sessions, "Thought Dream", was later included on the band's follow-up, I-Feel-Like-I'm-Fixin'-to-Die.

Reception

Bruce Eder in a retrospective review for AllMusic felt that the album is "one of the most important and enduring documents of the psychedelic era".
The album was included in Robert Dimery's 1001 Albums You Must Hear Before You Die.

Track listing
All songs by Country Joe McDonald, except where noted

 "Flying High" – 2:38
 "Not So Sweet Martha Lorraine" – 4:21
 "Death Sound Blues" – 4:23 - Labeled as "Death Sound" on the mono version of the album
 "Happiness Is a Porpoise Mouth" – 2:48 - Labeled as "Porpoise Mouth" on the mono version of the album
 "Section 43" – 7:23
 "Superbird" – 2:04
 "Sad and Lonely Times" – 2:23
 "Love"  (Joe McDonald, Barry Melton, David Cohen, Bruce Barthol, John Francis Gunning, Gary Hirsh) – 2:19
 "Bass Strings" – 4:58
 "The Masked Marauder" – 3:10
 "Grace" – 7:03

Personnel
Country Joe and the Fish
 Country Joe McDonald - lead vocals (tracks 1-4, 6, 9-11), rhythm guitar (tracks 2, 4, 7-9), tambourine (track 3), lead guitar (track 5), harmonica (track 5), backing vocals (track 7), bells (track 11)
 Barry Melton - lead guitar (tracks 1-5, 8-11), rhythm guitar (track 6), lead vocals (tracks 7, 8), bass (track 7)
 David Cohen - rhythm guitar (track 1), organ (tracks 2, 4, 5, 8-10), lead guitar (tracks 3, 6, 7, 11)
 Bruce Barthol - bass (all tracks except track 7), harmonica (tracks 7, 10)
 Gary "Chicken" Hirsh - drums; background noise (track 11) 
Technical
Jules Halfant - sleeve design

References

External links

Electric Music for the Mind and Body (Adobe Flash) at Radio3Net (streamed copy where licensed)

1967 debut albums
Vanguard Records albums
Country Joe and the Fish albums
Albums produced by Samuel Charters
Acid rock albums